Petr Korda was the defending champion, but lost in the quarterfinals to Amos Mansdorf.

Mansdorf won the title by defeating Todd Martin 7–6(7–3), 7–5 in the final.

Seeds
The first eight seeds received a bye to the second round.

Draw

Finals

Top half

Section 1

Section 2

Bottom half

Section 3

Section 4

References

External links
 Official results archive (ATP)
 Official results archive (ITF)

1993 ATP Tour
1993 in sports in Washington, D.C.
1993 in American tennis